Tomáš Ostrák (born 5 February 2000) is a Czech footballer who plays for Major League Soccer club St. Louis City SC.

Club career
Ostrák began his career at the Czech club MFK Frýdek-Místek. In 2016, he joined the youth academy of Bundesliga side 1. FC Köln. In January 2019, he was given the opportunity to train with the club's first team squad by manager Markus Anfang. Ostrák later spent two seasons on loan: during the 2019–20 season, he played for the Austrian club TSV Hartberg and, during the 2020–2021 season, for MFK Karviná in the Czech Republic.

On 28 August 2021 Ostrák made his debut appearance for Köln in a 2–1 home win against VfL Bochum. He came on as a substitute and provided and assisted on a goal by Tim Lemperle. In February 2022, it was announced that Ostrák would not renew his contract with Köln and join the Major League Soccer club St. Louis City SC, who would begin play in 2023, joining the second team first in July 2022.

International career
Ostrák has represented the Czech Republic as a youth international. Starting in 2017, he has played for his country's under-17, under-19, and under-21 teams.

References

Living people
2000 births
Association football midfielders
Czech footballers
Bundesliga players
1. FC Köln players
TSV Hartberg players
Austrian Football Bundesliga players
MFK Karviná players
Expatriate footballers in Austria
Czech expatriate sportspeople in Austria
Expatriate footballers in Germany
Czech expatriate sportspeople in Germany
People from Frýdek-Místek
Czech Republic youth international footballers
Czech Republic under-21 international footballers
Sportspeople from the Moravian-Silesian Region
MLS Next Pro players